Bembidion adygorum is a species of ground beetle from the Trechinae subfamily that can be found in Armenia, Georgia and Caucasus.

References

Beetles described in 1996
Beetles of Asia